Lee is a hamlet located in the Town of Lee in Oneida County, New York.

References

Hamlets in Oneida County, New York
Hamlets in New York (state)